Bob LePage (born May 7, 1946) is a former professional ice hockey defenceman. He was a member of the Canada men's national ice hockey team during the 1969-70 season.

LePagee played professionally in the American Hockey League, International Hockey League, and Central Hockey League between 1968 and 1974.

Awards
The IHL awarded LePage the Governor's Trophy as the league's most outstanding defenceman during the 1970-71 season.

External links

1946 births
Living people
Canadian ice hockey defencemen
Ice hockey people from Quebec
Albuquerque Six-Guns players